Seike is a Japanese surname. Notable people with the surname include:

, Japanese women's footballer
, Japanese beach volleyball player

Japanese-language surnames